There have been two Governments of the 33rd Dáil, both coalition governments of Fianna Fáil, Fine Gael and the Green Party. This followed the 2020 general election to Dáil Éireann held on 8 February, and negotiations on a programme for government that lasted till June. The parties agreed on a rotation, with the two major party leaders alternating as Taoiseach. It is the first time that Fianna Fáil and Fine Gael have participated in the same government, which Leo Varadkar described as the end of what has often been referred to as Civil War politics.

The 32nd Government of Ireland (27 June 2020 to 17 December 2022) was led by Micheál Martin, leader of Fianna Fáil, as Taoiseach, and Leo Varadkar, leader of Fine Gael, as Tánaiste. It lasted  days. 

The 33rd Government of Ireland (17 December 2022 to present) is led by Varadkar as Taoiseach and Martin as Tánaiste. It has lasted  days to date.

32nd Government of Ireland

Nomination of Taoiseach
The members of the 33rd Dáil first met on 20 February 2020. Taoiseach and Fine Gael leader Leo Varadkar, Fianna Fáil leader Micheál Martin, Sinn Féin leader Mary Lou McDonald and Green Party leader Eamon Ryan were each proposed for nomination as Taoiseach. None of the four motions were successful. Varadkar announced that he would resign as Taoiseach but that under the provisions of Article 28.11 of the Constitution, the members of the government would continue to carry out their duties until their successors were appointed.

On 27 June, the Dáil again debated nominations for the position of Taoiseach. The nomination of Martin was approved by the Dáil. Martin was then appointed as Taoiseach by President Michael D. Higgins.

Members of the Government
After his appointment as Taoiseach by the president, Micheál Martin proposed the members of the government and they were approved by the Dáil. They were appointed by the president on the same day.

Attorney General
Paul Gallagher SC was appointed by the president as Attorney General on the nomination of the Taoiseach, a role he had previously served in from 2007 to 2011.

Ministers of State

On 27 June 2020, the government on the nomination of the Taoiseach appointed Dara Calleary, TD, Hildegarde Naughton, TD, and Sen. Pippa Hackett as Ministers of State attending at cabinet without a vote. Pippa Hackett is the first senator to have been appointed as a Minister of State. On 1 July, the government appointed a further seventeen Ministers of State on the nomination of the Taoiseach.

Events affecting the government
Minister for Agriculture, Food and the Marine Barry Cowen was sacked on 14 July 2020 because of driving offences which he had committed but not disclosed to Micheál Martin prior to his appointment to cabinet. He was replaced by Dara Calleary.

Legislation was passed to allow each of three Ministers of State who attend cabinet meetings to receive an allowance, as previous legislation had provided an allowance for two only. After public dissatisfaction with the proposal, the three ministers of state agreed on 28 July 2020 to share the existing allowance between them, rather than accept the increase.

Minister for Agriculture, Food and the Marine Dara Calleary resigned on 21 August 2020 after the fallout from the Oireachtas Golf Society scandal. Phil Hogan resigned as European Commissioner for Trade on 26 August 2020 in response to the same events.

In October 2020, Village magazine published a claim that Leo Varadkar had provided a copy of a confidential document to the head of the National Association of General Practitioners that had been part of negotiations with the Irish Medical Organisation in April 2019 while Taoiseach. Fine Gael issued a statement which described the article as "both inaccurate and grossly defamatory", and while accepting that the provision of the agreement by private channels was "not best practice", said there was nothing unlawful about what had occurred. Sinn Féin tabled a motion of no confidence in the Tánaiste. In response, the Taoiseach moved a motion of confidence.

At a cabinet meeting in July 2021, Minister for Foreign Affairs Simon Coveney announced the appointment of Katherine Zappone, former Minister for Children and Youth Affairs, to the newly created position of Special Envoy to the UN for Freedom of Opinion and Expression. It emerged that the proposed appointment had not been flagged by Coveney with the Taoiseach in advance of the meeting. Zappone declined the appointment after the Merrion Hotel controversy arose, in which the Irish Independent reported that six days prior to the announcement of her appointment, Zappone had hosted a gathering for 50 guests, including Tánaiste Leo Varadkar, at the Merrion Hotel while the COVID-19 pandemic was ongoing. Comparisons were made between the gathering and the Golfgate scandal earlier in the pandemic. Sinn Féin tabled a motion of no confidence in Coveney, to be debated on 15 September on the return of the Dáil from the summer recess. In response, the Taoiseach moved a motion of confidence.

On 6 July 2022, the government lost its majority after Fine Gael TD Joe McHugh voted against legislation underpinning a €2.7 billion mica redress scheme and subsequently resigned the Fine Gael party whip. Sinn Féin tabled a motion of no confidence in the government, to be debated on 12 July before the summer recess. In response, the Taoiseach moved a motion of confidence.

On 24 August 2022, Robert Troy resigned as Minister of State at the Department of Enterprise, Trade and Employment after his failure to declare property interest was revealed by The Ditch. He was succeeded by former Minister for Agriculture Dara Calleary.

In December 2022, People Before Profit–Solidarity tabled a motion of no confidence in Minister for Housing Darragh O'Brien, to be debated on 13 December, four days before a new government was formed. The group claimed the worsening housing and homelessness crisis under O'Brien was "tearing apart the social fabric of Irish society and leading to the scapegoating of refugees". In response, the Taoiseach moved a motion of confidence.

Budgets
The Minister for Finance, Paschal Donohoe, and Minister for Public Expenditure and Reform, Michael McGrath, delivered the following budgets:
 2021 budget, delivered on 13 October 2020
 2022 budget, delivered on 12 October 2021
 2023 budget, delivered on 27 September 2022

Confidence in the government
On 10 November 2020, a motion of confidence in the Tánaiste and Minister for Enterprise, Trade and Employment, Leo Varadkar, proposed by Taoiseach Micheál Martin, was approved with 92 votes in favour to 65 against.

On 15 September 2021, a motion of confidence in the Minister for Foreign Affairs and Defence, Simon Coveney, proposed by Taoiseach Micheál Martin, was approved with 92 votes in favour to 59 against.

On 12 July 2022, a motion of confidence in the government, proposed by Taoiseach Micheál Martin, was approved with 85 votes in favour to 66 against, with one abstention.

On 13 December 2022, a motion of confidence in the Minister for Housing, Local Government and Heritage, Darragh O'Brien, proposed by Taoiseach Micheál Martin, was approved with 86 votes in favour to 63 against, with one abstention.

Resignation
Micheál Martin resigned as Taoiseach on Saturday 17 December 2022 to allow the appointment of Leo Varadkar as Taoiseach and the formation of a new government, which will be a continuation of the coalition between Fianna Fáil, Fine Gael and the Green Party for the remainder of the 33rd Dáil. The date agreed in the Programme for Government had been Thursday 15 December, but this date was put back to facilitate Martin's attendance at a meeting of the European Council.

33rd Government of Ireland

Nomination of Taoiseach
After the resignation of Micheál Martin as Taoiseach on 17 December 2022, Leo Varadkar was proposed for the nomination of the Dáil for the position of Taoiseach. This motion was approved and Varadkar was appointed by President Michael D. Higgins.

Members of the Government
After his appointment as Taoiseach by the president, Leo Varadkar proposed the members of the government and they were approved by the Dáil. They were appointed by the president on the same day.

Attorney General
Rossa Fanning SC was appointed by the president as Attorney General on the nomination of the Taoiseach.

Ministers of State

On 17 December 2022, the government on the nomination of the Taoiseach appointed Hildegarde Naughton, TD, Jack Chambers, TD, and Sen. Pippa Hackett as Ministers of State attending at cabinet without a vote. On 21 December, the government appointed a further seventeen Ministers of State on the nomination of the Taoiseach.

Events affecting the government
A month after the government was formed, in January 2023, news website The Ditch published a story claiming Minister of State for Employment Affairs and Retail Business Damien English failed to declare ownership of an existing home in his planning application for a new property in 2008. It also claimed he neglected to declare such ownership in the Dáil register of interests. He resigned as Minister of State on 12 January 2023. He was succeeded by Neale Richmond.

Also in January, the Sunday Independent revealed that Minister for Public Expenditure, National Development Plan Delivery and Reform Paschal Donohoe failed to properly declare a donation from a company in 2016. The Standards in Public Office Commission (SIPO) made a complaint against Donohoe that the Designer Group engineering firm used two company vans and six employees to erect and later remove election posters for Donohoe in his Dublin Central constituency during the 2016 general election campaign. On 14 January, Donohoe began conducting a review of his election expenses statements amid the allegations which he had denied. The next day, on 15 January, he apologised for making incorrect declarations of election expenses and donations during his campaign and said he would recuse himself from any decision making around ethics legislation while the SIPO investigated him, but refused to resign as minister. The controversy intensified on 20 January when Donohoe identified a new issue over expenses from the 2020 general election.

See also
 Politics of the Republic of Ireland

References

33rd Dáil
Cabinets established in 2020
Governments of Ireland
Coalition governments of Ireland
Grand coalition governments
Rotation governments
Current governments